Frans Pourbus the Younger (1569–1622) was a Flemish painter, son of Frans Pourbus the Elder and grandson of Pieter Pourbus. He was born in Antwerp and died in Paris. He is also referred to as "Frans II".

Pourbus worked for many of the highly influential people of his day, including the Brussels-based Spanish Regents of the Netherlands, the Duke of Mantua and Marie de' Medici, Queen of France. Works of his can be found in the Royal Collection, the National Museum in Warsaw, the Louvre, the Prado, the Rijksmuseum, the Royal College of Art, the Metropolitan Museum of Art and many other museums.

Style
Pourbus was best known for portraits, but created some history paintings. He produced portraits that were pleasing to his patrons, but rarely providing his works with dramatic situations, or even landscape backgrounds. He is noted for his depiction of costume, jewellery and draperies, as in his portrait of Henry IV of France (below).

Patronage
Pourbus completed his apprenticeship in Antwerp in 1591. At the end of the 16th century, he worked for Archduke Albert and the Infanta Isabella in Brussels. On 27 June 1600, he was paid for a portrait of the Infanta (see below). This was subsequently presented to Anne of Denmark (wife of James VI and I) by the Ambassador of the Spanish Netherlands and this work remains in the Royal Collection. 

In 1600, he was recruited as court painter in Mantua by Vincenzo Gonzaga, Duke of Mantua who met him when Gonzaga was on a visit to the Netherlands buying works of art. Within months of his appointment, Peter Paul Rubens arrived at the Mantuan court, but there is no evidence of hostility between the two. In 1609, Pourbus moved to Paris at the instigation of Marie de Médici (see her portrait below). It was here that he perfected his style. He worked as Marie de Médici's court painter until his death.

Death 
He died in Paris and was buried on 19 February 1621/2. The exact date of his death is unknown.

The "Anne Boleyn" portrait
Among his works is a portrait of an Italian lady in the Pinacoteca Malaspina, Pavia that has been incorrectly identified as Anne Boleyn, second wife of Henry VIII of England (see below). This identification is a result of a later inscription. The portrait was in any case painted some years after Anne Boleyn's death in 1536.

Other examples of his work

References

External links
 

1569 births
1622 deaths
16th-century Flemish painters
17th-century Flemish painters
Artists from Antwerp